Sleepers is the debut solo album from Rapper Big Pooh of North Carolina's Little Brother. It followed on the heels of bandmate Phonte's album with The Foreign Exchange, Connected (2004). The album features contributions and guest spots from Phonte, Nicolay, 9th Wonder and Los Angeles-based rapper Murs. It begins with an audio clip from film director Spike Lee's 1988 film, School Daze, and features a few audio excerpts from Christopher Nolan's 2002 film Insomnia throughout the album.

On July 3, 2012, Rapper Big Pooh released Sleepers: The Narcoleptic Outtakes on his label For Members Only, consisting of songs that didn't make the final track listing of Sleepers.

Track listing

Notes
 "Now" is a remix of "Keep the Bling" by Rapper Big Pooh, which was originally produced by Khrysis. This song would later appear on the Triple Play EP by the Justus League collective.

Personnel
 Art Direction – Christopher Gregory, Mischa "Dho" Burgess, Big Pooh (as Thomas Jones)
 Design – Christopher Gregory
 Executive Producer – Mischa "Dho" Burgess, Big Pooh (as Thomas Jones)
 Management – Mischa "Dho" Burgess
 Mastered By – Dave Kutch
 Photography By – Jati Lindsey, Kimberly Wu
 Recorded & Mixed By – 9th Wonder (tracks: 5, 10), Big Dho (tracks: 4, 11, 12), Khrysis (tracks: 2, 3, 6 to 9, 13, 14)

References

2005 debut albums
Little Brother (group) albums
Albums produced by 9th Wonder
Albums produced by Khrysis
Albums produced by Nicolay (musician)